Juan Antonio García Díez (4 August 1940 – 6 May 1998) was a Spanish politician from the Union of the Democratic Centre (UCD) who held several cabinet posts between 1977 and 1982, most prominently serving as Deputy Prime Minister of Spain from December 1981 to December 1982.

References

Deputy Prime Ministers of Spain
Economy and finance ministers of Spain
Government ministers of Spain
Industry ministers of Spain
Justice ministers of Spain
1940 births
1998 deaths
Complutense University of Madrid alumni